Siddhartha Basu is an Indian television producer-director and quiz show host, widely regarded as the "Father of Indian television quizzing".
 
He is best known for hosting shows such as Quiz Time, Mastermind India and University Challenge, and as producer-director of shows such as Kaun Banega Crorepati, Dus Ka Dum, Jhalak Dikhhla Jaa and India's Got Talent.

Founder-Director of the television production house BIG Synergy, & later a creative mentor and consultant with the company, he stepped back from all roles in the company in December 2018.

Along with Anita Kaul Basu, he is a Founder-director of Tree of Knowledge Digital, a greenfield venture in the area of interactive edutainment events, e-learning, gaming, publishing, and select television production.

Early life and education
Born in Calcutta in a Bengali Hindu family, Basu grew up in Bombay, Delhi, and Madras. He did his early schooling from Besant Montessori School and Cathedral and John Connon School, Bombay, and later studied at Frank Anthony Public School in Delhi. Next, he moved to Chennai and completed his schooling from Kendriya Vidyalaya, IIT Madras. He did his graduate studies in English Literature from St Stephen's College Delhi, and earned his MA degree in English as a boarder at Hindu College in the Arts Faculty at the University of Delhi.

Theatre
As an undergrad, in 1973, he became a founding member of "Theatre Action Group"(TAG), a theatre group in Delhi, under the artistic direction of Barry John. He acted in numerous plays, most noted for his performance in and as Oedipus and Mozart in Amadeus. After a hiatus of many years, he returned to the stage in Prime Time's landmark production of Mahesh Dattani’s Dance Like a Man, playing the roles of Jayaraj and Amritlal.

Career

Siddhartha Basu's career in television began in 1977 as a documentary filmmaker with a company called TVNF after he completed his MA in English Literature from University of Delhi. Meanwhile, he also worked with All India Radio as an announcer and hosted programs on General Overseas Service, and Yuva Vani.

In 1985, he first hosted the inaugural series Quiz Time on Doordarshan. It was an inter-collegiate quiz show, still well remembered for the quality of quizzing and quizzers. Basu moved on to host and produce subsequent series of Quiz Time, Spectrum (TV series) - the 7 nation SAARC Quiz, The India Quiz, and The Beanstalk Quiz Summit (On Doordarshan), Mastermind India, University Challenge (2003) on BBC World, and India's Child Genius on STAR World.

Along with his wife, former India Today journalist Anita Kaul Basu, he formed the media company Synergy Communications Pvt. Ltd. in Delhi in 1988, which in due course became Synergy Adlabs, then BIG Synergy - after its tie-up with Reliance Mediaworks. Promoted by Siddhartha and Anita Kaul Basu, and Karun Prabhakaran, BIG Synergy built its reputation as a leader in the field of factual entertainment, starting off as one of the country's first independent television production houses.

In 2010, Big Synergy was named "Production House of the Year" at the Indian Television Awards.

In 2011, the BIG Synergy team won the "Indian of the Year – Entertainment" award of CNN-IBN.

Basu's biggest quiz show success came in the form of Kaun Banega Crorepati, first produced for STAR Plus in 2000. KBC, as the show is also known, is the licensed Indian version of the globally successful format Who Wants to Be a Millionaire? with Bollywood star Amitabh Bachchan as its host. The second edition of the show KBC2 began airing in August 2005 and notched up the highest ever opening in the history of Indian television, going on to sustain its position among the most-watched programs in the country. The third series of Kaun Banega Crorepati was hosted by Shah Rukh Khan in 2007, while 5 subsequent seasons between 2010-2014 and again from 2017 to 2019 were once again hosted by Amitabh Bachchan. As of 2018, Siddhartha Basu has been associated with the show as a knowledge partner, together with DigiTOK (Tree of Knowledge Digital) and as a creative consultant.

The first 2 seasons of Sony's hit show Jhalak Dikhhla Jaa, the Indian version of BBC's celebrity dance show, Dancing with the Stars, was produced by BIG Synergy, as were the first 2 seasons of India's Got Talent, on Colors TV. Big Synergy has also produced other landmark shows such as Aap Ki Kachehri - Kiran Ke Saath, Sacch Ka Saamna and Dus Ka Dum, with Salman Khan as host, on Sony Entertainment Television.

Starting in 2017, Tree of Knowledge has produced 4 seasons of NewsWiz, a quiz show based on news and current affairs, with participation by high school students from all over the country, hosted by Rajdeep Sardesai, on India Today TV.

Film acting

He has played a few character roles in Hindi movies – R&AW Chief Robin Dutt (RD) in Shoojit Sircar's critically acclaimed film Madras Cafe (2013), barrister and Bombay Mayor Romi Mehta in Anurag Kashyap's period extravaganza Bombay Velvet (2015). He acted as President of India in the superhit 2014 Malayalam movie of Rosshan Andrews, How Old Are You? which was later reprised in Tamil as 36 Vayadhinile (2015). He did play the part of India's Minister of External Affairs in the recent action blockbuster Tiger Zinda Hai.

Personal life

Siddhartha is married to Anita Kaul, who worked as a journalist with India Today magazine from 1983 to 1988 and with whom in 1988 he set up Synergy, a television production company. They have a son, Aditya, who is presently working in the Hindi film industry, and daughter Medha who works with an international organization in the field of public policy.

Books
 Inquizitive -The India Quiz Book. Seagull Books Pvt. Ltd., 1989. 
 Mastermind India with Siddhartha Basu. Teksons Bookshop in association with BBC Worldwide Ltd, 1999. .
 Mastermind India 2. Penguin Books India in association with BBC Worldwide, 2000. .
 Mastermind India 3. Penguin Books India in association with BBC Worldwide, 2001. .
 The Complete Mastermind India, Vol. 1. Penguin Books India, 2002. .
 Mastermind India 4. Penguin Books India and BBC Worldwide, 2003. .
 Mastermind India 5. Penguin Books India and BBC Worldwide, 2004. .
 Kaun Banega Crorepati - The Official Book. Rupa, 2010. 
 Know for Sure. Encyclopædia Britannica South Asia. .

Filmography

References

External links
 Interview with Siddhartha Basu, India's No. 1 Quiz Master 23 January 2008.
 
 BIG Synergy, website

Living people
Male actors from Kolkata
21st-century Bengalis
Bengali Hindus
Kendriya Vidyalaya alumni
St. Stephen's College, Delhi alumni
Indian television executives
Indian television producers
Indian game show hosts
Indian television directors
Hindu College, Delhi alumni
Cathedral and John Connon School alumni
Male actors in Hindi cinema
Male actors in Malayalam cinema
Male actors in Tamil cinema
21st-century Indian male actors
Indian male film actors
Year of birth missing (living people)